Denise Payet is a female international table tennis player from England.

Table tennis career
She represented England at the 2018 World Team Table Tennis Championships (Corbillon Cup women's team event) with Maria Tsaptsinos and Tin-Tin Ho. She then went on to win a bronze medal at the 2018 Commonwealth Games in the Women's team event. alongside Kelly Sibley, Tsaptsinos and Tin-Tin Ho.

See also
 List of England players at the World Team Table Tennis Championships

References

English female table tennis players
2001 births
Living people
Commonwealth Games medallists in table tennis
Sportspeople from London
Table tennis players at the 2018 Commonwealth Games
Commonwealth Games bronze medallists for England
Medallists at the 2018 Commonwealth Games